FBC may refer to:

Medicine
 Full blood count

Broadcasting
 Fana Broadcasting Corporate, an Ethiopian broadcaster
 Fijian Broadcasting Corporation
 FBC TV
 Finnish Broadcasting Company
 Fox Broadcasting Company, referred to on air as "Fox"
 Fox Business Network, known before its launch as the Fox Business Channel
 Fukui Broadcasting, a Japanese television station

Education
 Faith Baptist College, Rivers State, Nigeria
 Fellowship Baptist College, Negros Occidental, Philippines
 Fourah Bay College, Freetown, Sierra Leone

Finance
 FBC Bank, Zimbabwean bank
 Flagstar Bank, American bank

Religion
 First Baptist Church (disambiguation)
 Florida Baptist Convention

Sport
 Fitzroy Baseball Club, Melbourne, Australia
 Football club
 Freedom Boat Club, American yacht club

Legislation
 Florida Building Code
 Form-based code

Technology
 Fluidized bed combustion
 Fragile base class

Business
 FBC Media, British public relations firm
 Frankfurter Büro Center, Frankfurt am Main, Germany
 Foster’s Bootcamp Club, Amsterdam based unique bootcamp experience, founded by Loek Foster

Other
 Fare basis code, in the airline industry
 Full Blown Chaos, an American metalcore band